is a Shinto shrine located in Uda, Nara, Japan. The honden was built near the end of the Kamakura period, and is listed as a National Treasure of Japan.

Shinto shrines in Nara Prefecture
National Treasures of Japan
Uda, Nara